The Jean Butz James Museum is a historic house and former museum at 326 Central Avenue in Highland Park, Illinois. The Italianate house was built in 1871, two years after Highland Park's establishment. The Highland Park Building Company built the house without a buyer, as it expected that the new city would attract many affluent Chicagoans in the coming years. Its design includes a yellow brick exterior, bracketed eaves, and a widow's walk. The Highland Park Historical Society bought the house in 1969 and converted it to a historic house museum, which opened in 1972.

The house was added to the National Register of Historic Places on September 29, 1982. The Highland Park Historical Society closed the museum and relocated in 2015.

References

National Register of Historic Places in Lake County, Illinois
Houses on the National Register of Historic Places in Illinois
Highland Park, Illinois
Historic house museums in Illinois
Italianate architecture in Illinois
Houses completed in 1871